The Lom Pangar Dam is an embankment dam with a center gravity dam section currently under construction on the Lom River about  north of Bertoua in the East Region of Cameroon. The purpose of the dam is to produce hydroelectric power and to regulate water flows along the Sanaga River. It is potentially part of a larger dam cascade on the Sanaga.

Funding and development
The African Development Bank issued a US$71.1 million loan for the project in November 2011. The World Bank also approved a US$132 million loan March 2012 and the President of Cameroon, Paul Biya, laid the foundation stone for the dam on 3 August 2012. The European Investment Bank approved a US$39 million loan in October of the same year. China International Water & Electric Corporation is constructing the dam and power plant. A coffer dam to divert the river around the dam foundation was completed in July 2013. The project was completed in 2017.

See also

 List of power stations in Cameroon

References

Dams completed in 2017
Earth-filled dams
Hydroelectric power stations in Cameroon
Dams in Cameroon
East Region (Cameroon)